The 2011 Rally Catalunya, formally 47è Rally RACC Catalunya – Costa Daurada and the denoted RACC Rally de España, was the twelfth round of the 2011 World Rally Championship season. The rally took place over 21–23 October, and was based in Salou, Catalonia. The rally was also the eighth and final round of the Super 2000 World Rally Championship, and the sixth round of the Production World Rally Championship.

The rally was won by championship leader Sébastien Loeb, who took his fifth victory of the season, and the 67th of his career after taking the lead at the end of the first day's running and held on to extend his championship lead ahead of the final round in Wales. In doing so, he also secured a seventh manufacturers' title for Citroën. Loeb's title rival Mikko Hirvonen finished second after team-mate Jari-Matti Latvala, who finished third, incurred a two-minute time penalty in order to gain as many points as possible for Hirvonen's title challenge.

In the SWRC, Juho Hänninen finished at the head of the class in tenth overall, and as a result, secured the SWRC title, ahead of Ott Tänak. In the PWRC, Patrik Flodin just fended off a challenge from Michał Kościuszko in the late stages of the rally, with Flodin coming out on top by just two seconds.

Results

Event standings

Special stages

Power Stage
The "Power stage" was a live, televised  stage at the end of the rally, held near Pradell de la Teixeta.

References

External links 

 Results at eWRC.com
 Official Website of RACC Rally Catalunya

Catalunya
Rally Catalunya
Catalunya Rally